U.S. Route 5 (US 5) is a part of the United States Numbered Highway System that runs from New Haven, Connecticut, to the Canada–United States border at Derby Line, Vermont. In Vermont, the road runs south–north from the Massachusetts state line near Guilford to the international border. The  that lie in Vermont are maintained by the Vermont Agency of Transportation (VTrans) and run largely parallel to Interstate 91 (I-91). US 5 also follows the path of the Connecticut River from the Massachusetts border to St. Johnsbury, where the river turns northeast while US 5 continues north. The highway serves the major towns of Brattleboro, Hartford, and St. Johnsbury, along with the city of Newport near the Canadian border.

Before the development of the Numbered Highway System, US 5 was designated Route 2 and was part of the New England road marking system that existed from 1922 to 1927. When the highway system was formed in November 1926, the former Route 2 was commissioned as US 5. At this point, the road was not paved. It was not paved until the state of Vermont started overseeing the maintenance of the highway in 1931. The road was completely paved by 1933.

Route description
US 5 winds through the far eastern part of Vermont, passing through many small towns and villages. The road runs through a fairly rural, wooded area throughout much of its path in Vermont.

Southern Vermont
US 5 enters the southern end of Vermont in Windham County at the Massachusetts–Vermont state line just north of Bernardston and just south of Guilford. The route is known as the Calvin Coolidge Memorial Highway from the Massachusetts border to the junction of Vermont Route 103 (VT 103) in Rockingham. The road winds through wooded land along the west side of I-91 for its first  in Vermont. In Brattleboro, Vermont's fourth-largest town, US 5 crosses under the Interstate and winds through Brattleboro's business district. North of Brattleboro, after VT 9 turns east, US 5 crosses back over the Interstate to the west side.

US 5 continues north from Brattleboro, passing near the small towns of Dummerston and Putney. North of Putney, it crosses over I-91 to serve the towns of Westminster, Bellows Falls, and Rockingham. Near Rockingham, US 5 intersects VT 103, which picks up the Calvin Coolidge Memorial Highway. Here, it picks up a  concurrency with VT 11 and US 5 crosses back to the east side of I-91 with VT 11.

US 5 continues along the east side of I-91 for  after its concurrency with VT 11. Along this stretch, US 5 passes through Wilgus State Park in Ascutney and the town of Windsor. In Ascutney, US 5 picks up VT 12 for a  concurrency. VT 12 winds along with US 5 through Windsor and across the Interstate to Hartland, where it turns northwest away from US 5. North of Hartland, US 5 crosses under I-89 in White River Junction with no interchange and intersects I-91 again. Now on the east side of I-91, US 5 winds around the northwest edge of White River Junction, where it hooks up with US 4. US 4 and US 5 run concurrent for half a mile as a divided four-lane surface arterial, crossing the White River. US 5 continues north to the village of Wilder, where it forms the main road of the village. North of Wilder, US 5 crosses I-91 twice. Just north of Norwich, US 5 crosses into Orange County and the town of Thetford. US 5 continues north, following the Connecticut River closely for  until it reaches the town of Bradford, passing through the small villages of North Thetford and Ely.

Northern Vermont

Here, US 5 has a very brief concurrency with US 302. Continuing north, US 5 crosses into Caledonia County, then travels  before crossing to the west side of I-91, passing through East Ryegate and Barnet. US 5 winds along the west bank of the Passumpsic River, traveling through the village of Passumpsic. It is here in St. Johnsbury that the Connecticut River turns east away from US 5.

US 5 continues north along the Passumpsic River from St. Johnsbury for about  until it reaches the town of Lyndon. In Lyndon, US 5 splits to the east away from I-91. Along this stretch, US 5 reaches Orleans County. In the town of Orleans, US 5 crosses to the west side of the Interstate, concurrent with VT 58 for half a mile. US 5 continues north for  before reaching Newport. Along this  stretch, the road passes through Coventry. In Newport, US 5 picks up a  concurrency with VT 105 that takes US 5 across I-91 and into the village of Derby Center. US 5 continues past the Derby Line–Stanstead Border Crossing into Quebec as Route 143.

History

In 1922, before the United States Numbered Highway System's creation, US 5 traversed through Vermont as Route 2, the Connecticut River Way. Five years later in 1927, at the creation of the highway system, Route 2 was almost completely overtaken by the new US 5. At its original designation, US 5 mostly followed Route 2's path, except for a temporary routing into New Hampshire. From 1927 to 1929, US 5 crossed the Connecticut River at Bellows Falls into North Walpole, New Hampshire, and wound along the river to Charlestown, New Hampshire, where it crossed back into Vermont.

US 5 was not maintained by the state of Vermont until the creation of the state highway system in 1931. At this point, US 5 was not paved. The state of Vermont started paving the route in 1931, and it was completed by 1933.

Major intersections

See also

References

External links

Brattleboro, Vermont
Transportation in Caledonia County, Vermont
Transportation in Orange County, Vermont
Transportation in Orleans County, Vermont
Transportation in Windham County, Vermont
Transportation in Windsor County, Vermont
05-0
 Vermont